The Brushed Pottery culture was a European Bronze Age archaeological culture found in present-day eastern Lithuania, Belarus, and southeastern Latvia. It succeeded the Neolithic Narva culture. It got its name from its characteristic flat-bottomed pottery, the outer surface of which is generally brushed with strokes, believed to be applied with bundles of straw or grass during pottery making.

Formation

The oldest settlements considered to be a part of Early Brushed Pottery culture are dated to 1300-1100 BC, and are found along the rivers Neris and Šventoji. It replaced the Narva culture, which existed in the region to 1700 BC. While traditionally it is believed that the Narva culture was replaced by Indo-European influence carried by Corded Ware culture, this viewpoint has been challenged, and a distinction is made between Corded Ware-influenced Western Baltic culture, and separate Brushed Pottery culture.

Technology and culture
The Brushed Pottery culture was conservative and changed very little during its lifespan, only adopting new technologies (such as bronzeworking and ironworking) from nearby cultures.

The most recognizable feature of the culture are hillforts, which were first established circa 1000 BC. They are believed to have been able to house from 80 to 120 inhabitants, in rectangle shaped houses of wooden pole construction, and were fortified. 110 hillforts belonging to Brushed Pottery culture have been found in Eastern Lithuania.

Extensive findings of stone axes and bones of sheep, pigs, cattle as well as hunted animals in hillfort excavations show that Brushed Pottery peoples engaged in a mix of hunting-gathering and animal husbandry, with less focus on agriculture. Some Brushed Pottery hillforts show signs of intensive metallurgy, such as numerous clay casting molds. Animal bone was used as a substitute for metals and bone tools were used, likely borrowed from late Narva culture, which extensively used bone as raw material.

Very little is known about the burial practices of Brushed Pottery culture, as no graves dated to this culture have been found. Several theories have been suggested to explain this, such as cremation, or exotic burial practices, such as burial at water or burial trees.

Decline
The Brushed Pottery culture disappeared in 3rd-5th centuries AD. It is considered to correspond to ancestral Baltic tribes and Proto-Baltic language.

See also
 Corded Ware culture
 Milograd culture
 Pomeranian culture
 Western Baltic culture

References

Archaeological cultures of Eastern Europe
Bronze Age cultures of Europe
Archaeological cultures in Latvia
Archaeological cultures in Lithuania
Archaeological cultures in Belarus
Baltic archaeological cultures